Barhi Birpur 「²」(बरही बीरपुर)  is a village development committee in Saptari District in Province No. 2 of south-eastern Nepal. At the time of the 2011 Nepal census it had a population of 6,504 people living in 1,193 individual households. Ray and Yadav are majority cast of Barhi Birpur. software engineer bibek Yadav aaps developer & device producer lives in Kathmandu's. Barhi birpur is Now Chhinnamasta VDC.Barhi Birpur is Agriculture land for Rice and paddy Production.「³」

References
2. Barhi Birpur is include in Chhinnamasta

3. चैते धान रोप्ने चटारोले किसानको ब्यस्तता,पानी नहुँदा समस्या ( Birpur Barahi to Barhi Birpur)

4.https://newstoday.com.np/2017/07/25/15235

5. बरही बीरपुर ( Maithili Wikipedia)

Populated places in Saptari District
VDCs in Saptari District